Archirhoe is a genus of moths in the family Geometridae.

Species
 Archirhoe associata (McDunnough, 1941)
 Archirhoe indefinata (Grossbeck, 1907)
 Archirhoe multipunctata (Taylor, 1906)
 Archirhoe neomexicana (Hulst, 1896)

References
 Archirhoe at Markku Savela's Lepidoptera and Some Other Life Forms

Larentiinae
Geometridae genera